Cloughfold is a small hamlet in between the towns of Rawtenstall and Waterfoot in Rossendale, Lancashire, England.

Clough Fold railway station on the Rawtenstall to Bacup Line opened in 1871 and closed when the line closed in 1966.

Notable people
 Caleb Ashworth (1722–1775) an English dissenting tutor.
 Sir David James Shackleton (1863–1938) a cotton worker and trade unionist who became the third Labour Member of Parliament in 1902

Villages in Lancashire
Geography of the Borough of Rossendale